Yushu (also Romanized as Yūshū and Yooshoo; also known as Yūshūr) is a village in Jolgeh-e Mazhan Rural District, Jolgeh-e Mazhan District, Khusf County, South Khorasan Province, Iran. At the 2006 census, its population was 13, in 5 families.

References 

Populated places in Khusf County